Choiromyces is a genus of truffle-like fungi in the Tuberaceae family. The widespread genus contains five species.

References

External links

 

Pezizales
Truffles (fungi)
Pezizales genera